Liszna may refer to the following places:
Liszna, Lublin Voivodeship (east Poland)
Liszna, Lesko County in Subcarpathian Voivodeship (south-east Poland)
Liszna, Sanok County in Subcarpathian Voivodeship (south-east Poland)